The Nariin Sukhait or Ovoot Tolgoi mining complex is located in the Gurvan tes sum (district) of Ömnögovi Province in Southern Mongolia. The site is 25 km SE from sum center and 56 km north of Shivee Khüren - Ceke crossing point on the Mongolian-Chinese border.

Three companies operate at Nariin Sukhait Mine as independent coal producers, namely, Mongolyn Alt Corporation LLC, Mongolia; and Mongolian-Chinese JV "Qinhua-MAK-Nariin Sukhait" LLC; as well as South Gobi Energy Resources Inc (a subsidiary of Ivanhoe Mines Inc), through its local subsidiary South Gobi Sands LLC.

Nariin Sukhait is reported to hold about 380 million mt of resources of high-rank, low-ash, low-sulphur metallurgical and steam coal, of which 220 million mt of resources belong to the licenses of Mongolyn Alt Corporation LLC and 160 million mt of coal is delineated under the licenses of South Gobi Energy Resources Inc.  

In 2008 the mine produced and sold about 1.9 million mt of coal in total (2005 - 1.7 million mt) of which Mongolian-Chinese JV "Qinhua-MAK-Nariin Sukhait" LLC exported 1.2 million mt; Mongolyn Alt Corporation LLC marketed 0.635 million mt; and South Gobi Energy Resources Inc sold 0.113 million mt.

In accordance with the Special Permit for the construction of railway from the Nariin Sukhait mine to the  Mongolian-Chinese border granted to Mongolyn Alt Corporation LLC, the construction of the 47.8-km railway from the mine to the presently existing railhead at Ceke is scheduled to start up in early 2010.

References

Coal mines in Mongolia
Surface mines in Mongolia